Gobipterygidae is a family of extinct enantiornithine birds known from the Cretaceous of Asia.

References

Euenantiornitheans
Prehistoric dinosaur families